William Belknap may refer to:

 William W. Belknap (1829–1890), lawyer, soldier, government administrator and the United States Secretary of War
 William G. Belknap (1794–1851), his father, United States Army general
 William Richardson Belknap (1849–1914), president of the Belknap Hardware and Manufacturing Company
 William Burke Belknap (1885–1965), his son, American entrepreneur